Kak trevozhen etot put is the fifth studio album by Russian Soviet singer Alla Pugacheva released in 1982 by Melodiya. Album was released as a double album, but later also distributed as separate long plays.

The album contains studio recordings from 1980–1981; the second disc of the album contains several live recordings from 1981 from one of the solo concerts of Pugacheva's program "Monologues of a singer".

There was also an export version of the album called How Disturbing Is This Way for distribution abroad. In Czechoslovakia album was released in 1984 by the name Dávná Píseň.

Background 
In August 1980, Pugacheva began shooting in the lead role in the film Recital, but was subsequently suspended from work and did not tour in the USSR for several months. In November–December 1980, she toured Czechoslovakia (as part of the programme "Days of culture of the USSR in Czechoslovakia") and in the cities of Germany. In Cologne, Pugacheva participated in the WDR radio concert as part of the international music festival. In December 1980, for the first time since the September incident with Recital Pugacheva performed in the USSR — in the Moscow variety Theater, she gave a series of concerts "Alla Pugacheva Theater".

Preparation for filming in the film "Recital" and for concerts for guests of the "Olympics-80", as a result — infrequent tours and rare appearances of Pugacheva on Central television in 1980 affected her popularity. In 1980, there were almost no new hits. The songs "Moskovsky romans", "Ukhodya - ukhodi", "Kogda ya ujdu", "Kak trevozhen etot put" did not gain much popularity among listeners. And only one song became the most popular - "Uletaj, tucha", by the then unknown composer Viktor Reznikov. For this reason, for the first time in 4 years, Pugacheva did not become a winner of the all-Union festival "Pesnya goda". In General, 1980 was a difficult and crucial year in the singer's creative and personal life, separating the period of the 1970s and 1980s.

Release 
Pugacheva finished work on the album in 1981, but Melodiya constantly delayed its release. As a result, the album was released only in September 1982. In anticipation of the album's release, three singles were released as minions "Maestro","Dezhurny angel" and "Ya bolshe ne revnuyu". Originally released as a double album, it was later also distributed as separate records: Kak trevozhen etot put 1 and Kak trevozhen etot put 2.

Recording 
At the end of 1980, Pugacheva started working on the record. In "Little Blue Light" in 1980–81, Pugacheva performs the song "Maestro" to the music of the Latvian composer Raimonds Pauls and poems by Ilya Reznik. Thanks to this song, there is a creative tandem "Reznik-Pauls-Pugacheva" and such songs as "Starinniye chasy", "Vosvrashcheniye", "Bez menya", "Delu vremya" and others. The composer of almost all the songs from the album was Pugacheva herself. The music for the three compositions was written by Raimonds Pauls, the song "Beda" was written by Vladimir Vysotsky, which in the early 1980s was often performed by Alla Pugacheva at solo concerts, in particular in the concert program "Monologues of the singer". Vysotsky wrote "Beda" for his wife Marina Vladi in 1973. The album also includes several concert recordings from 1981 from one of the solo concerts of Pugacheva's program "Monologues of a singer".

Track listing

References

Bibliography
 

1982 albums
Alla Pugacheva albums
Melodiya albums
Russian-language albums